Birra Stela is a beer company based in Tirana, Albania. It is the second largest beer producer in the country with an annual production capacity of 250,000 hl, covering roughly 15-18% of the domestic market.

See also 
 Economy of Albania
 Companies of Albania
 Birra Malto Brewery
 Birra Tirana

References
 

Beer brands
Birra Stela
Stela
Drink companies of Albania